William Loren McGonagle (November 19, 1925 – March 3, 1999) was a United States Navy officer who received the Medal of Honor for his actions while in command of the  when it was attacked by Israel in the Eastern Mediterranean on June 8, 1967 during the Six-Day War.

After accepting a commission in the United States Navy in 1944, McGonagle held various assignments before taking command of the Liberty in 1966. In June 1967 the Liberty was sailing in international waters in the Eastern Mediterranean when it was attacked by the Israel Defense Forces, injuring McGonagle, killing and injuring other members of his crew, and severely damaging the ship. He maintained control of the ship until help arrived, and after healing from his wounds was awarded the Medal of Honor for his actions on the Liberty in 1967. He continued his navy career, holding several more positions until retiring in 1974. When he died in 1999 he was buried at Arlington National Cemetery with full military honors a short distance from the graves of some of his crew who were killed during the attack.

Naval career
McGonagle was born November 19, 1925 in Wichita, Kansas. After attending secondary school and college in California, he enlisted in the United States Navy in 1944 and for the next three years participated in a navy training program at the University of Southern California. In June 1947 he accepted a commission in the navy as an ensign. He was assigned to the destroyer  and after that was posted to the minesweeper  from 1947–1950. During the Korean War he served on the minesweeper  during the extensive operations that earned him and the other members of the crew a Presidential Unit Citation. From 1951 to 1966, he was assigned to various positions ashore and afloat, including commands of the fleet tug  from 1957 to 1958 and the salvage ship  from 1961 to 1963.

On June 8, 1967, during the Six-Day War between Israel and her Arab neighbors, the Liberty was attacked by Israeli forces while sailing in international waters in the Eastern Mediterranean. The Israeli government claims to this day that they thought that the ship was an Egyptian vessel. Israel relentlessly attacked the Liberty with jets, helicopters, and motor torpedo boats. McGonagle was severely wounded during the first air attack and although the bridge had sustained heavy damage he stayed and directed the defense of the ship, refusing to leave his post for medical attention. As the Israeli fighters continued their attack he maneuvered his ship, directed its defense, supervised the control of flooding and fire, and saw to the care of the casualties. Captain McGonagle remained at his battle station and continued to command his ship for more than 17 hours. It was only after rendezvous with a United States destroyer that he relinquished personal control of the Liberty and permitted himself to be removed from the bridge. The combined air and sea attack killed 34 crew members including naval officers, seamen, two Marines, and a civilian, wounded 171, and severely damaged the ship. Although the ship had a 39 ft (12 m) wide by 24 ft (7.3 m) high hole and a twisted keel from a torpedo impact, the crew kept the ship afloat, and were able to leave the area under their own power. When the damage to the ship was assessed 821 rocket, shell, and machine-gun holes were found in the ship's hull.

The Medal of Honor was presented to him, in secret, at the Washington Navy Yard by the Secretary of the Navy, rather than at the White House by the President. This represents the only time a Medal of Honor recipient was awarded in such a manner. After being promoted to captain in October 1967 and recovering from his wounds he was given command of the new ammunition ship . He then served as commanding officer of the Naval Reserve Officer Training Corps Unit at the University of Oklahoma before retiring from active duty in 1974.

Death and legacy
On March 3, 1999 he died in Palm Springs, California and, following services at the Post Chapel at Fort Myer, Virginia, he was buried with full military honors on April 9, 1999 at Arlington National Cemetery with members of his USS Liberty crew in attendance. His grave can be found in section 34, lot 208 map grid U/V 11 near the common gravesite of six other members of the USS Liberty crew.

Awards and honors

Medal of Honor citation

The President of the United States of America, authorized by an Act of Congress, June 11, 1968, has awarded, in the name of Congress, the Medal of Honor to

Captain McGonagle’s Medal of Honor citation does not list the nationality of the military forces which attacked his ship. This omission is highly unusual and was due to a cover-up by the incumbent presidential administration, which has continued to this day.

Other honors
A Golden Palm Star on the Palm Springs Walk of Stars was dedicated to McGonagle for Veterans Day in 1999, recognizing him as one of five Medal of Honor recipients from the Southern California desert area.

The Captain William L. McGonagle Branch Medical/Dental Clinic was dedicated at Naval Security Group Activity Northwest, Chesapeake VA, on December 5, 1997.  This is believed to be one of the few times in history a U.S. Naval building has been dedicated in honor of a living sailor.

See also

 List of Medal of Honor recipients

Notes

External links and further reading
 
 
 
 
 
 
 
 
 

1925 births
1999 deaths
USS Liberty incident
United States Navy Medal of Honor recipients
United States Navy officers
United States Navy personnel of World War II
United States Navy personnel of the Korean War
United States Navy personnel of the Vietnam War
Military personnel from California
People from Palm Springs, California
People from Wichita, Kansas
Burials at Arlington National Cemetery